This Summer Feeling is a 2015 French-German drama film directed by Mikhaël Hers and starring Anders Danielsen Lie and Judith Chemla.

Cast 
 Anders Danielsen Lie as Lawrence
 Judith Chemla as Zoé
 Marie Rivière as Adélaïde
 Féodor Atkine as Vladimir
 Dounia Sichov as Ida
 Stéphanie Déhel as Sasha
 Lana Cooper as June
 Thibault Vinçon as David
 Laure Calamy as Anouk
 Timothé Vom Dorp as Nils
 Jean-Pierre Kalfon as Faris
 Marin Ireland as Nina
 Josh Safdie as Thomas
 Mac DeMarco as Marc
 Trey Gerrald as Harvey

References

External links 
 

2015 films
2015 drama films
2010s French-language films
2010s English-language films
2010s German-language films
French drama films
Films about grieving
Films directed by Mikhaël Hers
Films set in Berlin
Films set in New York (state)
Films set in Paris
German drama films
2010s French films
2010s German films